Piz Paradisin (also known as Pizzo Paradisino) is a mountain of the Livigno Alps, located on the border between Italy and Switzerland. On its west side lies a glacier named Vadreit da Camp.

References

External links
 
 Piz Paradisin on Hikr
 Piz Paradisin on Summitpost

Mountains of the Alps
Mountains of Graubünden
Mountains of Lombardy
Alpine three-thousanders
Italy–Switzerland border
International mountains of Europe
Mountains of Switzerland
Poschiavo